Lindsay Joan Schmidt (24 January 1920 in Maroona, Victoria - 19 March 2003) was an Australian former cricket player.

Schmidt played seven Test matches for the Australia women's national cricket team.

References

1920 births
2003 deaths
Australia women Test cricketers
Cricketers from Victoria (Australia)
Sportswomen from Victoria (Australia)